BCZ may refer to:

 Berlin Control Zone, the airspace within a 20-mile radius of a pillar in the cellar of the Allied Control Authority Building
 Bronze Cross of Zimbabwe, a gallantry decoration